Advanced Technological Institute, Kegalle is one of the Government Institutes for Higher Studies. ATI Kegalle offers Four courses: Higher National Diploma in Information Technology, Higher National Diploma in Accountancy, and Higher National Diploma in English & Higher National Diploma in Project Management. These courses are under the control of the Sri Lanka Institute of Advanced Technological Education (SLIATE)

References

2009 establishments in Sri Lanka
Colleges in Sri Lanka
Education in Kegalle
Buildings and structures in Kegalle